Qezeljeh (also Romanized as Qezeljah; also known as Qezeljeh-ye Rūdbār, and Qiziljāh) is a village in Bazarjan Rural District, in the Central District of Tafresh County, Markazi Province, Iran. At the 2006 census, its population was 588, in 134 families.

References 

Populated places in Tafresh County